Jupiter was an 80-gun  of the French Navy, designed by Sané.

In 1836, she ferried Admiral de Markau from Brest to Fort de France to replace Admiral Halgan as governor in the Caribbean. In 1837, she ferried troops to Algeria. She took part in the naval parade of 6 September 1850 in Cherbourg, and in the Crimean War.

Struck in 1863, she was used as a barracks hulk in Rochefort from 1870.

References
 Jean-Michel Roche, Dictionnaire des Bâtiments de la flotte de guerre française de Colbert à nos jours, tome I

Ships of the line of the French Navy
Ships built in France
Bucentaure-class ships of the line
1831 ships